{{Infobox religious biography
|name = Hōun Jiyu-Kennett
|image = RevMasterJiyu.jpg
|caption = Reverend Master Jiyu-Kennett at Shasta Abbey
|birth_name = Peggy Teresa Nancy Kennett
|alias = 
|dharma name = 
|birth_date = 
|birth_place = St Leonards-on-Sea, Sussex, United Kingdom
|death_date = 
|death_place = Mount Shasta, California, United States
|nationality = 
|religion = Buddhism
|school = Sōtō Zen Buddhism
|lineage = 
|title = Rōshi
|location = Shasta Abbey
|education = Durham UniversityTrinity College of Music
|occupation = 
|teacher = Seck Kim SengSuigan Yogo
|reincarnation of = 
|predecessor = Keido Chisan Koho
|successor = Daizui MacPhillamyFormer Head of the OrderHaryo YoungHead of the OrderMeian ElbertCurrent Abbess of Shasta AbbeyDaishin MorganFormer Abbot of Throssel Hole Abbey
|students =   
|spouse = 
|partner = 
|children = 
|website = 
}}

Hōun Jiyu-Kennett (Japanese: 法雲慈友ケネット, 1 January 1924 – 6 November 1996), born Peggy Teresa Nancy Kennett, was a British roshi most famous for having been the first female to be sanctioned by the Sōtō School of Japan to teach in the West.

Biography

Early years
Hōun Jiyu-Kennett was born as Peggy Teresa Nancy Kennett in St Leonards-on-Sea, Sussex, England on January 1, 1924. As a young woman she found herself questioning gender roles in society and grew to become disillusioned with Christianity. She studied medieval music at Durham University and then received a scholarship to Trinity College of Music in London, England. Though attracted to Buddhism, she felt during this period that she was called to serve the Church of England as a priest. However, church policies at the time did not allow women to be ordained, and this enhanced her previous disillusionment with Christianity.

Training at Sojiji

She first became interested in Theravada Buddhism during this period of questioning and searching, joining the London Buddhist Vihara. In 1954 she joined the London Buddhist Society, where she continued her Buddhist studies and lectured. While there, she met the scholar D.T. Suzuki, and developed a strong interest in Rinzai Zen Buddhism. In 1960, when chief abbott Kōho Keidō Chisan Zenji of Sojiji in Japan came to the society, she was asked to make the arrangements for his stay. Koho asked if she would consider becoming his student back in Japan. She accepted the offer, and two years passed before she arrived at Sojiji to study Soto Zen Buddhism under him.

In January 1962, Kennett traveled to Malaysia to accept an award she had been honored with for setting a Buddhist hymn, "Welcome Joyous Wesak Day" by Sumangalo, to music.  Before leaving for Japan, Kennett was ordained a novice nun by Venerable Seck Kim Seng (釋金星; Shì Jīnxīng) in the Linji Chan school and given the Buddhist name Jiyu (慈友, Cíyou in Chinese, Jiyu in Japanese) meaning compassionate friend.

Jiyu-Kennett arrived in Japan in 1962, where she was also ordained in the Soto-school, and trained at Sōjiji from 1962 to 1963. Formally, Kōho Keidō Chisan Zenji was her teacher, but practically, one of Keido Zenji's senior officers, Suigan Yogo roshi, was her main instructor, because 'Keido Zenji was often preoccupied with administrative affairs. She received Dharma transmission twice, from Kōho Keidō Chisan Zenji on May 28, 1963, but also from Suigan Yogo.

While training at Sōjiji, Kōho Keidō Chisan let her take care of westerners who were interested in Zen training, mostly from American military bases, and she "developed a regular programme of teaching and meditation to nurture their growing interest in Zen." Eventually, she received the official title of "Foreign Guest Hall Master" from Keido Chisan.

Jiyu-Kennett continued her institutional career by becoming an Oshō, i.e. "priest" or "teacher." Her Zuise ceremony was conducted in public in Japan. Previously, women's ceremonies were held in private, but Koho had decided that the practice of holding private ceremonies for women and public ceremonies for men was wrong. According to Jiyu-Kennett's account, 

Following her Zuise ceremony, Jiyu-Kennett was installed as shinzan (head priest) of Unpukuji temple in Mie prefecture.

Return to the west
After the death of Chisan Koho, in November 1967, the Soto Administration Section became ambivalent to her, and "Kennett’s title of Foreign Guest Hall Master was deleted from the list of Sojiji office appointments." Nevertheless, according to Jiyu-Kennett, she "received a certificate asking me to become the official pioneer missionary of the Soto Sect
in America" just before she left Japan for a lecturing tour the US in November 1969, At this time Jiyu-Kennett was not in good health, as during her time in Japan she had experienced many illnesses.

In 1969 Jiyu-Kennett founded the Zen Mission Society in San Francisco, and in 1970 Shasta Abbey in Mount Shasta, California, the first Zen monastery in the United States to be established by a woman. In 1972, Jiyu-Kennett's British chapter of the Zen Mission Society established Throssel Hole Priory in Northumberland, England.Snelling, 206 In 1978 Jiyu-Kennett changed the name of the Zen Mission Society to the Order of Buddhist Contemplatives.

Illness and visions
In 1975 Jiyu-Kennett was stricken with illness yet again, and this time she became bedridden. In 1976, worn out and convinced death was near,  she resigned from her position as abbess of Shasta Abbey and went into retreat in Oakland, California. Still rather ill, of unknown causes, she had her student Daizui MacPhillamy with her often to tend to her care. Following a kensho experience he had, she conferred Dharma transmission to him at her bedside in 1976.

During this retreat, Jiyu-Kennett had a prolonged religious experience, including a series of visions and recalling past lives. She regarded these experiences as "a profound kensho (enlightenment) experience," constituting a third kensho, and published an account of these visions, and an elaborate scheme of stages of awakening, in How to Grow a Lotus Blossom. Her interpretations, which parallel Christian mysticism, were controversial, and rejected by some as makyo ("illusion"). Stephen Batchelor describes these episodes, 

Around four months into her 'third kensho', Jiyu-Kennett regained her health and again assumed her position as Abbess of Shasta Abbey for the next 20 years until her death on November 6, 1996. According to Jiyu-Kennett, her experiences are not uncommon, but are rarely spoken of; she regarded publishing her own experiences as a way to acknowledge the existence and validity of such experiences, which, according to her, may contribute to further insight after initial awakening. She acknowledged the risks and potential for controversy in publishing her account, but felt that the benefits of releasing such information outweighed the risks.

According to Kay, "Kennett’s visionary experiences – and also her ambivalence about the status of their content – are not unprecedented within the Zen tradition. Soto literature includes numerous accounts, as noted especially by Faure (2001) Visions of powere, described by the founders of Soto Zen, Dogen and Keizan. Yet, Dogen and Keizan "also both warned against seeing visions or unusual spiritual experiences as the goal of practice."

Teachings
According to Jiyu-Kennett the accumulation of insight happens in three stages of kensho, along with a fourth that can occur at the time of death: 
 "initial glimpse" kensho, or "great flash of deep understanding," that most Zen practitioners eventually experience, and that are often used in the Soto-tradition as the later basis for qualification for Dharma Transmission;
 "On-Going Fūgen Kensho," or in D.T. Suzuki's words, "the little moments that make one dance," experienced by practitioners with a continual, stable practice;
 based on her personal experience with visions, Jiyu-Kennett postulated a third stage which involves the recalling of past life experiences, profound spiritual visions, and deep awakening experiences, that bring great clarity to aspects of the Dharma and practice, and go beyond what is experienced in the first kensho;
 parinirvana, experienced by rare practitioners who achieve Buddhahood upon time of death.

Teaching style
Jiyu-Kennett had a commanding presence about her, both intellectually as well as physically. Of a rather husky build, she had a tremendous laughter and was known to be gifted at storytelling. To some, her demeanor appeared rather persistent at times, as author James Ishmael Ford writes, 

According to the book The Encyclopedia of Women and Religion in North America'', 

Jiyu-Kennett was an advocate for equality between the sexes, as was Great Master Dogen.

Dharma heirs
 Haryo Young (Head of the Order of Buddhist Contemplatives)
 Meian Elbert (Abbess of Shasta Abbey)
 Daishin Morgan (Former Abbott of Throssel Hole Buddhist Abbey)
 Daizui MacPhillamy

Among many others...

Legacy
The Order of Buddhist Contemplatives, founded by Jiyu-Kennett, now has chapters in the United States, the Netherlands, Canada, the West Indies, the United Kingdom and Germany.

See also
Buddhism in Europe
Buddhism in the United States
Timeline of Zen Buddhism in the United States

Bibliography

Notes

References

Sources

Further reading

External links
Order of Buddhist Contemplatives
Shasta Abbey
Throssel Hole Buddhist Abbey

1924 births
1996 deaths
Soto Zen Buddhists
Zen Buddhist nuns
Alumni of Durham University
People from Hastings
English Zen Buddhists
Buddhist new religious movements
Buddhist abbesses
People from Mount Shasta, California
British expatriates in Japan
British expatriates in the United States